HMC Projects in Central and Eastern Europe is a registered charity and a company limited by guarantee operating from UK. It offers opportunities for students and teachers from 14 Central and Eastern European countries to respectively either study or teach in a British private school for an academic year.

History

Call to Action by Robin Schlich
In the spring 1992 Conference & Common Room an article was published about schools forging individual links with countries in Central and Eastern Europe. This inspired Robin Schlich to call for a formation of a committee, so no countries would go under- or over-represented. On 5 October 1992 the first meeting of the committee was held in HMC offices in Leicester, with Roger Wicks as the chairman and Robin Schlich as the secretary. Also, in that September the first two students from Czechoslovakia came to the UK.

First alumni
In September 1993 the first official HMC scholars came to United Kingdom as part of the students' scholarship scheme. In that year students came from seven countries: Bulgaria, Czech Republic, Hungary, Latvia, Lithuania, Romania and Slovakia. In 1994 Croatia, Macedonia, Moldova, Mongolia, Poland and Yugoslavia followed. Rest of the countries have joined during the following years.

Foundation of Teachers Scheme
In 1996 a scheme for young teachers from Eastern and Central Europe was also set up. It was soon approved by the British Council and UK Border Agency. Since 1996 more than 300 teachers have joined British independent schools for a year.

Member countries
Currently the project consists of 14 countries in central and eastern Europe. 13 of these take part in both of the schemes: Bosnia-Herzegovina, Bulgaria, Croatia, Czech Republic, Estonia, Georgia, Moldova, Montenegro, Poland, Romania, Serbia, Slovakia and Ukraine. Hungary only takes part in the teachers' scheme. In 2013 Georgia will also be joining the project. Latvia, Lithuania, Macedonia and Mongolia have also previously taken part in the project.

Participating schools
The project has sent students to almost 100 schools. The project mainly consists of public schools, but also includes some academies, like Wymondham College. During the years, some international schools have also taken part: Aiglon College in Switzerland, British School in Brussels, Salem Castle School in Germany and Bromsgrove International School in Thailand.

Notable alumni
Doina Cebotari - General Secretary of Washington European Society, Advisor to the Prime Minister of Moldova
Răzvan Orăşanu - former Senior Advisor on Economic Affairs for the Prime Minister of Romania

References

External links
 Official homepage

News items
 Mandić, Hajdana "Patrik Tobin: U Crnoj Gori sam da intervjuišem đake za stipendije u Britaniji!" Pobjeda 23.01.2012 (in Montenegrin)
 Pokk, Kaspar "Paide õpilane Eliise Peelo valiti Briti Nõukogu keskkooliõpilaste vahetusprogrammi" AS Kuma 24.04.2008 (in Estonian)
 Randmäe, Kati "Ian Small - Mind üllatas teie õpilaste suurepärane inglise keele tase.” SL Õhtuleht 22.05.2002 (in Estonian)
 SITA "Školáci si užijú rok na prestížnych školách v USA a Británii" webnoviny.sk 23.05.2012 (in Slovakian)
 Truus, Kaarin "Eesti koolilapsed löövad Inglismaal läbi” SL Õhtuleht 22.05.2002 (in Estonian)
 "Как украинским студентам бесплатно поступить в иностранную школу" Segodnya 15.02.2011 (in Russian)

Educational charities based in the United Kingdom
Education in Europe
Charities based in Leicestershire